7α-Thiomethylspironolactone sulfoxide (also known as 7α-TMS sulfoxide, 7α-thiomethylspironolactone S-oxide, or 7α-methylsulfinylspironolactone) is a metabolite of spironolactone (brand name Aldactone), an antimineralocorticoid and antiandrogen medication. 7α-TMS sulfoxide is specifically formed from 7α-thiomethylspironolactone (7α-TMS).

References

Human drug metabolites
Lactones
Pregnanes
Spiro compounds
Spirolactones
Spironolactone
Sulfoxides